Kymberly Kathryn Evanson (née Kymberly Kathryn Evans; born 1977) is an American lawyer who is a nominee to serve as a United States district judge of the United States District Court for the Western District of Washington.

Education 
Evanson earned a Bachelor of Arts degree from Seattle University in 1999 and a Juris Doctor from the Georgetown University Law Center in 2007.

Career 
From 2002 to 2004, Evanson worked as a program coordinator for the Access to Justice Institute at Seattle University School of Law. In 2005, she was a law clerk at Cashdan & Kane LLP in Washington, D.C. In 2006, she was an intern in the United States Department of Justice Civil Division. In 2007 and 2008, she served as a law clerk for Judge Emmet G. Sullivan of the United States District Court for the District of Columbia. From 2009 to 2011, she was an associate at K&L Gates in Seattle. She joined the Seattle law firm Pacifica Law Group in 2011 and has since worked as a partner at the firm.

Notable cases 

In 2017, Evanson represented the ACLU of Washington in a suit against the Trump Administration's foreign travel ban (Trump travel ban) in Washington v. Trump (also known as the "Muslim ban").

Nomination to district court 
On July 13, 2022, President Joe Biden nominated Evanson to serve as a United States district judge of the United States District Court for the Western District of Washington. President Biden nominated Evanson to the seat vacated by Judge Ricardo S. Martinez, who assumed senior status on September 5, 2022. On November 15, 2022, a hearing on her nomination was held before the Senate Judiciary Committee. On December 8, 2022, her nomination was reported out of committee by a 12–10 vote. On January 3, 2023, her nomination was returned to the President under Rule XXXI, Paragraph 6 of the United States Senate. She was renominated on January 23, 2023. On February 9, 2023, her nomination was reported out of committee by a 12–9 vote. Her nomination is pending before the United States Senate.

References 

1977 births
Living people
21st-century American women lawyers
21st-century American lawyers
Georgetown University Law Center alumni
People from Longview, Washington
Seattle University alumni
Washington (state) lawyers